Bertalan Pintér (born 23 March 1973) is a Hungarian bobsledder. He competed at the 1998, 2002 and the 2006 Winter Olympics.

References

1973 births
Living people
Hungarian male bobsledders
Olympic bobsledders of Hungary
Bobsledders at the 1998 Winter Olympics
Bobsledders at the 2002 Winter Olympics
Bobsledders at the 2006 Winter Olympics
Sportspeople from Budapest